Passaic: Birthplace of Television and the DuMont Story is a television play which aired on the DuMont Television Network on November 14, 1951.

The short tele-play was broadcast live and was a drama about the rise of DuMont Laboratories and its founder Allen B. DuMont, who appears as himself at the end of the 15-minute broadcast. DuMont founded DuMont Laboratories in 1931, and the DuMont Television Network in 1946. Besides his work in television, DuMont is best known for his work in improving the cathode ray tube, and for his contributions to the development of radar.

Preservation status
At least two archives have copies of the telecast, including the UCLA Film and Television Archive.

See also
List of programs broadcast by the DuMont Television Network
List of surviving DuMont Television Network broadcasts

References

Bibliography
David Weinstein, The Forgotten Network: DuMont and the Birth of American Television (Philadelphia: Temple University Press, 2004) 
Alex McNeil, Total Television, Fourth edition (New York: Penguin Books, 1980) 
Tim Brooks and Earle Marsh, The Complete Directory to Prime Time Network TV Shows, Third edition (New York: Ballantine Books, 1964)

External links
Passaic: Birthplace of Television and the DuMont Story at IMDB
DuMont historical website

DuMont Television Network original programming
Black-and-white American television shows
1950s American television specials
1951 television plays
1951 television specials
1951 in American television
Mass media in New Jersey